NGC 6153 is a planetary nebula in the constellation Scorpius. It was discovered in 1883 by Ralph Copeland.

An analysis of Gaia data suggests that the central star may be a binary system.

References

External links
 

Planetary nebulae
Scorpius (constellation)
6153